Franc Peternel (born 9 November 1932) is a Slovenian sports shooter. He competed at the 1976 Summer Olympics and the 1980 Summer Olympics.

References

1932 births
Living people
Slovenian male sport shooters
Olympic shooters of Yugoslavia
Shooters at the 1976 Summer Olympics
Shooters at the 1980 Summer Olympics
Sportspeople from Kranj